Peter Carter, OBE (born 1949) is an Independent Healthcare Consultant. Previously he has served as the general secretary and Chief Executive of the Royal College of Nursing. He is a Fellow of the Royal College of Nursing, and Hon fellow of the Royal College of General Practitioners and an Ad Eundem of the Royal College of Surgeons of Ireland

Career
Peter Carter trained for three years as a psychiatric nurse at Hill End Hospital in St Albans, then worked at the then regional adolescent unit at Hill End Hospital, undertaking further training in family therapy and crisis intervention. Carter is also a general nurse and trained at St Albans City Hospital and the Institute of Urology in London, and held clinical and managerial posts in Hertfordshire, Bedfordshire and London.

He started his managerial education at the Chartered Institute of Personnel and Development, and got an MBA and PhD from the University of Birmingham. He spent almost twelve years as the Chief Executive of the Central and North West London Mental Health NHS Trust, and in January 2007 became general secretary and Chief Executive for the Royal College of Nursing (RCN). 

In July 2013, Carter was awarded an honorary doctorate by Edge Hill University. He was awarded the OBE for services to the National Health Service (NHS) in the 2006 New Year's Honours list. In 2011 he was awarded the inaugural Presidents medal of the Royal College of Psychiatrists.

He is visiting professor at Anglia Ruskin, Canterbury Christchurch, Chester and Kings College Universities, and vice president of the Institute of Customer Service.

Royal College of Nursing
Carter succeeded Beverly Malone as general secretary of the Royal College of Nursing in January 2007. After becoming the general secretary and chief executive of the RCN, Peter Carter restructured his top team and re-focused the organisation to address outstanding issues and the ongoing reforms of the NHS. Under his leadership, the RCN established itself as a leading voice on nursing and health in the UK political arena. 
He was said by the Health Service Journal to be the 28th most powerful person in the English NHS in December 2013.

The RCN won awards under his leadership as an exemplar employer – obtaining a Gold award from Investors in People and, since 2010, being in the Sunday Times Best 100 Not for Profit Organisations. At the time of his leaving the RCN in 2015, the RCN membership had reached its highest-ever membership of over 430,000.

Interim appointments 
On 9 November 2016, the Medway NHS Foundation Trust announced Carter had been appointed interim chair, whilst a new chair was appointed on a permanent basis. In October 2017 he was appointed to the same role at East Kent Hospitals University NHS Foundation Trust and served until March 2018. He has also served as interim chair of North Middlesex NHS University Trust.

Notable moments
In 2010 Peter assumed the position of honorary colonel to 203 (Welsh) Field Hospital in Cardiff. The hospital has deployed on operations as a formed unit in 2008 to Afghanistan; additionally many of its personnel have seen active service on operations in the Balkans and Iraq. Carter is a keen supporter of military nursing and has hosted tri-service events at Cavendish Square. In conjunction with his support of military nursing, Carter visited Basra, Iraq, in 2007 at the height of the conflict and in 2011 spent a week in Afghanistan, where he visited troops, nurses and medical personnel in a number of locations.

In 2011 Carter was awarded the inaugural presidents medal from the Royal College of Psychiatrists.

In 2013 he was awarded an Honorary Fellowship of the Royal College of General Practitioners.

He has been awarded four honorary doctorates. Universities of Edge Hill and Hertfordshire in 2013, in 2014 from the University of South Wales and in 2018 from the University of Bedfordshire.

He has given numerous TV and radio interviews and is a regular contributor to newspapers and professional journals. He has twice been the subject of  BBC series Hard Talk.

References

Alumni of the University of Birmingham
English nurses
British nursing administrators
Living people
Officers of the Order of the British Empire
People from St Albans
1949 births
Place of birth missing (living people)
Male nurses
Fellows of the Royal College of Nursing
British nurses